The 2000 Missouri gubernatorial election was held on November 7, 2000 and resulted in a narrow victory for the Democratic nominee, State Treasurer of Missouri Bob Holden, over the Republican candidate, U.S. Representative Jim Talent, and several other candidates. Incumbent Democratic Governor Mel Carnahan was term-limited and could not run for re-election to a third term in office. However, he was killed in a plane crash on October 16, 2000, while campaigning for Missouri's Class 1 Senate seat. Lieutenant Governor Roger B. Wilson was appointed the office following Carnahan's death.

Coincidentally, Talent would later be elected at the 2002 Senate special election and defeated Mel Carnahan's widow Jean Carnahan to begin the rest of Mel Carnahan's unexpired Senate term. Until 2020, this was the only time since 1972 that the winner of the Missouri gubernatorial election did not come from the same party as the winner of the presidential election held simultaneously (although Democratic presidential nominee Al Gore did win the popular vote; it would not be until the 2016 gubernatorial election that Missouri elected a governor from the party whose presidential nominee lost the national popular vote).

This gubernatorial election was one of the closest in Missouri's history. Bob Holden did well, as expected in St. Louis and Kansas City. Talent easily won most rural parts of the state. Holden did poorly in the St. Louis suburbs. However Holden's wins in the Democratic strongholds of St. Louis and Kansas City proved to be just enough to push him over the finish line. Because the election was decided by less than 1%, Talent could have requested a recount that his campaign would have to pay for since it was not below half a percent. However, most recounts never see a swing of more than 1,000 votes, and Talent was trailing by 21,445. Talent ultimately did not request a recount and conceded defeat on the late evening of November 14.

Results

References

Gubernatorial
2000
Missouri